Lemogang is a masculine name of Botswanan origin. Notable people with the name include:

 Lemogang Kwape, Botswanan politician
 Lemogang Maswena (born 1991), Botswanan footballer

African masculine given names